Night Market Life is a Taiwanese Hokkien television drama that began airing on Formosa Television in Taiwan on 22 December 2009. This is also known as the first HD drama ever broadcast on Formosa Television.

It stars Chen Meifeng, Morning Chang, Peng Chia-chia (澎恰恰), Jimmy Ni (倪齊民), Wang Shih-hsien, Fon Cin, Mike Lee (李政穎) and Chiang Tsu-ping among others.

Very little of the show is actually set in a night market. Rather, the show is centered on several vendors at a night market whose children befriend each other and go their separate paths upon reaching adulthood.  As the series' popularity grew, the story was expanded to span two generations of characters; the children of the first part are grown up in the second part, which began on 7 April 2010 & the theme song was changed to dialect version.

The show aired in Taiwan every weeknight at prime time (20:00) with episodes which have ranged in length from 135 to 150 minutes including commercial advertisements.  The producers received funding from the Government Information Office to produce the series in high definition. With admiration and some criticism, the show concluded on 19 July 2011, when the brand-new television drama of Formosa Television, was released.

Plot
The story takes place between 1998 and 2018 where children grow up from childhood in a Night Market to adulthood in the outside world. Cai Yue Xia (Maria) (Chen Meifeng) works as a Chinese Herb Soup hawker in her store at the Jin Hua Night Market. She has a husband, Li Qing Xiang (Lewis) (Louis Hsiao) who is a businessman. Together, they have a son, Li You Zhi (Bryan) (Child: Liu Yi Qian, Adult: Wang Shih-hsien) and a daughter, Li You Hui (Chloe) (Child: Peng Min Jia, Adult: Fon Cin). They are once happy family until Qing Xiang betrayed his wife and married He Nana (Gracie) (Zhang Qiong Zhi) and were blessed with a daughter named Li Xiao Xuan (Winny) (Child: Li Yu Feng, Adult: Chu Xuan). He Nana was not pleased that Qing Xiang did not give her a right status, so she challenges Yue Xia and despises her two children. Qing Xiang is rather cowardly and not willing to help Yue Xia.

Yue Xia divorces with Qing Xiang and married Jiang Yi Guan (Charles) who is the ex-boyfriend of Fang Qia Qia (Audra), mother of Jin Da Feng (Dylan), a politician and wife of Jin Ju Fu (Jimmy). Yi Guan is a gang leader and he is assisted by Hei Ren (Joachim) and Bai Mu (Nicholas), but has a soft-heart when come to problems of Yue Xia's family and You Zhi and his classmates. Yue Xia's life gets even worse because of such fact makes Qia Qia seek her as her enemy. Meanwhile, Qing Xiang has a business partner, Ye Han Liang (Johnny), a fashion clothes seller, and the father of Ye Ru Yi (Cassie). Qing Xiang and Han Liang have always against each other ever since their negotiation for co-business have failed. Xu Lai Fa (Ryan) comes from a poor family and have to sell chewing gum to make ends meet. He has a mother, Huang Jin Xiu (Angela) who worked very hard to earn income for the family and a father, Xu Bing Ding (Jason) who is a drunkard once a gambler. You Zhi, You Hui, Da Feng, Xiao Xuan, Ru Yi and Lai Fa are classmates when they are young and care for each other at all times as they grew up, they are known as the "golden six" because they are the most notable school choir club member. The School Choir Club was led by Jiang Yi Fan (Eunice), sister of Jiang Yi Guan until she dies when she give birth to Pan Jia Xin (Mirabel). One day, Yi Guan was sentenced to prison for 20 years after found guilty of killed Tie Zhi (Jaws).

20 years later, all the six schoolmates lead their different paths of life. Li You Zhi is just a common construction labour and often got into fight with gangsters whenever they approach him and marries Pan Ke Xin (Natasha). Li You Hui and Li Xiao Xuan hold high positions at Yilida Bicycle Company, they often got into conflict wherever they are but Xiao Xuan was supported strongly at the back by Fang Qia Qia. Jin Da Feng opens his own company and becomes its CEO. Xu Lai Fa becomes a doctor and marries Ye Ru Yi, a makeup receptionist but he is highly ambitious until he left Ru Yi and marries Chen Chun Chun (Venisia). Both You Hui and Xiao Xuan declared their love to Jin Da Feng, caused Da Feng to be pushed into a love triangle affairs. Wu Yin Min and Fang Qia Qia cooperate together as gangster leaders and try to break down Li You Zhi and his friend's life. Xu Lai Fa loses his friends, his wife's and his money because of his greed and was disposed by many. So he uses Zhou Xiu Xiu (Marina) to seduce Chen He Qian in order to rise up again.

Ru Yi managed to give birth of her child and take care of her for the rest of her life. You Hui becomes vengeful and stops anything or anyone that gets into her path, this is especially after she divorces with Da Feng because he was in romance with Xiao Xuan. You Hui then snatched husband Yang Hao Tian (Felix) after that who is already in love with Chun Zhen (Leonore). Yang Hao Tian is heir to Yilida but due to him being seduced by You Hui, he left the bicycle company and established a new one called Shuda. This strained his relationship with his family. One day, Jin Da Feng started to become cruel heart and killed Fan Ke Xin one day in the latter's wedding with You Zhi, he is wanted by the police and is on the run. Meanwhile, both Lai Fa and Ru Yi found themselves both have Leukaemia and Cervix Cancer respectively. Lai Fa is taken care by Zhou Xiu Xiu and have regret in the process. As the series goes by, Li You Zhi saw Xu Lai Fa and Jin Da Feng's regret and desire to redeem their mistakes. Li You Zhi work with his friends together to overpower Ying Ming and Qia Qia and send them to justice. After Ying Ming and Qia Qia apprehended, Da Feng surrenders to the police while Ru Yi have her child taken care by Lai Fa's father and flew to United States with her father to receive treatment.

Summary
Cai Yuexia operates a stall at a night market while her husband, Qingxiang, works in the mainland. Their family falls apart when Qingxiang sets up another family outside. Yuexia struggles to bring up her children with the help of the head of the night market.

Cast

Main Cast

Supporting Cast

Cameo Appearances

HD broadcasts of the show

Limited run HD broadcast on HiHD
13 episodes of the HD version of the show were broadcast on HiHD, later PTS3. The reason that only 13 episodes were broadcast were most likely to test HD television in Taiwan, as HiHD was the first HD TV channel in Taiwan.

CTS HD broadcast
Only the first generation of the show was broadcast in HD on CTS Main Channel starting January 16, 2018 on 8pm to 10pm, 2 one-hour format episodes per weekday. Due to CTS mainly broadcasting in Mandarin, the dubbed Singapore version was shown. The reason why only the first generation was broadcast was most likely due to it being a quick filler for the prime time slot and/or to test the HD version of the show.

Taiwan rerun broadcast
The show was rebroadcast in a new 16:9 HD version, showing new info on the sides of the screen on FTV One. The timeslot for the rerun is Weekdays 1pm to 3pm, with each day showing 2 one-hour format episodes. After airing, the remastered episodes also get released on Formosa TV's YouTube channel.

International broadcast

Singapore broadcast
The series was broadcast on weekends from 7 to 10pm but due to local broadcast laws prohibiting radio or television broadcasts in Chinese dialects, the show was dubbed into Mandarin when it aired on Singapore's MediaCorp Channel 8, thus making it the first channel to broadcast the show in Mandarin.

Tentative everyday broadcast (2012)

There were plans for this drama to extend to every night broadcast after Journey to the West ends on 30 August 2012 as it is similar in view of the number of episodes. It has planned to broadcast every night at 7:00 pm with 7–10 episodes shown each week and plans to end its run in November 2013. Many criticisms were being posted online when Love took over the everyday broadcast in July 2010 and also MediaCorp Channel 8 has planned for more Malaysian productions and other overseas drama serials to be broadcast. Furthermore, there was a revamp of the evening primetime slot with current affairs programme Hello Singapore airing weekdays and premiering together with socio-drama , Healing Hands. Thus, the drama was only aired on weekends and ended its run on 4 July 2015, marking a telecast of more than 4 years and 4 months on Channel 8, holding the record for the longest primetime drama airing.

Repeat telecast (2014 and 2017)
The drama has succeed from Unique Flavor at the 04:00 SST timeslot in May 2014, when Unique Flavor finishes its repeat telecast and ended its ReRun on 29 April 2016 6AM. The drama is currently broadcast on weekdays (except Friday due to broadcasting of Getai Challenge 2018 at 11.30 am) from 10.30 am to 12.30 pm with Chinese subtitles and ended its telecast on 11 Setempber 2019, which Lee Family Reunion succeeded the 10.30 am to 12.30 pm timeslot.

Vietnam broadcast
The Vietnamese dub "Đời Sống Chợ Đêm" was broadcast on Vinh Long Television Station Channel (THVL) in the daily 5pm timeslot, replacing The Spirits of Love.

Malaysia broadcast
On October 20, 2010, the show was broadcast on Weekdays in the 3:30pm–4:30pm timeslot (this was later changed to 4-5pm) on Astro Hua Hee Dai, replacing The Spirits of Love. 
The drama was also broadcast in Malaysia on 8TV for two episodes with one hour each from Monday to Friday, at 11:30 MST and 14:00 MST with a 30 minutes break of its Midday Mandarin News at 12:30 MST starting 1 January 2015.

Music

Theme Song

Sub Theme Songs

See also
Taiwanese drama

References

External links
Program webpage at Formosa Television website 
Program cast and synopsis

Taiwanese drama television series
Formosa Television original programming
2009 Taiwanese television series debuts
2011 Taiwanese television series endings
Hokkien-language television shows